Dasia vyneri, also known commonly as Shelford's skink and Vyner's tree skink, is a species of lizard in the family Scincidae. The species is native to Southeast Asia.

Etymology
The specific name, vyneri, is in honor of Charles Vyner de Windt Brooke, who was to become the last White Raja of Sarawak.

Geographic range
Dasia vyneri is known only from Sarawak, Malaysia.

Habitat
The preferred natural habitat of D. vyneri is forest.

Description

Behavior
Dasia vyneri is an arboreal species.

Reproduction
Dasia vyneri is oviparous.

References

Further reading
Greer AE (1970). "The Relationships of the Skinks Referred to the Genus Dasia ". Breviora (348): 1–30. (Lamprolepis vyneri, new combination, p. 19).
Shelford R (1905). "A new Lizard and a new Frog from Borneo". Annals and Magazine of Natural History, Seventh Series 15: 208–210. ("Lygosoma (Keneuxia) Vyneri ", sp.n., pp.208–209. 
Smith MA (1937). "A Review of the Genus Lygosoma (Scincidae: Reptilia) and its Allies". Records of the Indian Museum 39 (3): 213–234. (Dasia vyneri, new combination, p. 226).

vyneri
Reptiles described in 1905
Reptiles of Malaysia
Taxa named by Robert Walter Campbell Shelford
Taxobox binomials not recognized by IUCN
Reptiles of Borneo
Endemic fauna of Borneo